Nebria atlantica is a species of ground beetle in the Nebriinae subfamily that is endemic to Morocco.

References

atlantica
Beetles described in 1883
Beetles of North Africa
Endemic fauna of Morocco